Atal Bhujal Yojana (or, Atal Jal,  Atal Groundwater Scheme or Atal Water) is a groundwater management scheme launched by Prime Minister Narendra Modi on the 95th birth anniversary of former Prime Minister Atal Bihari Vajpayee, on 25 December 2019. The purpose of the scheme is to improve groundwater management in seven states of India.

History  
In June 2018, the World Bank Board approved the scheme and it will be funded by the World Bank. It was launched on 25 December 2019 under the Jal Jeevan Mission.

Gujarat, Haryana, Karnataka, Madhya Pradesh, Maharashtra, Rajasthan, and Uttar Pradesh are the designated priority states for improvement of groundwater management through community participation, impacting around 78 districts and 8350 gram panchayats. The duration of the scheme is from 2020 to 2025.

Other agriculture schemes launched by Modi regime 

Agriculture initiatives schemes launched by the Narendra Modi regime are:

 2020 Indian agriculture acts
 Atal Bhujal Yojana
 E-NAM for online agrimarketing
 Gramin Bhandaran Yojana for local storage
 Micro Irrigation Fund (MIF)
 National Mission For Sustainable Agriculture (NMSA)
 National Scheme on Fisheries Training and Extension
 National Scheme on Welfare of Fishermen
 Pradhan Mantri Kisan Samman Nidhi (PMKSN) for minimum support scheme
 Pradhan Mantri Krishi Sinchai Yojana (PMKSY) for irrigation
 Paramparagat Krishi Vikas Yojana (PKVY) for organic farming
 Pradhan Mantri Fasal Bima Yojana (PMFBY) for crop insurance

See also

 Agriculture in India
 Irrigation in India

References 

Modi administration initiatives
Government schemes in India
Memorials to Atal Bihari Vajpayee